Mystery Train is a Nancy Drew and Hardy Boys Supermystery crossover novel. It was published in 1990.

Plot
Nancy, Frank, Joe, and Bess are all on the trail of the Comstock Diamond Case, an unsolved theft case, that has worked its way to the interests of a team of "professionals", with a "missing" reward of $25,000. The first step in solving the crime is to recreate the trail of the culprit, boarding a train from Chicago to San Francisco. But the case turns deadly when a shadowy suspect starts to sabotage the train. It is up to the trio to find suspects, solve the case, and bring the real cold-hearted criminal to justice. They face a kidnapper, a thief, and a saboteur.

Adaptation 
The 13th installment in the Nancy Drew point-and-click adventure game series by Her Interactive, named Nancy Drew: Last Train to Blue Moon Canyon, is loosely based on the novel.

References

External links
Supermystery series books

Supermystery
1990 American novels
1990 children's books
Novels set on trains
Novels adapted into video games